Anurophorus is a genus of Collembola belonging to the family Isotomidae.

The genus was first described by Nicolet in 1841.

The species of this genus are found in Europe and Northern America.

Species:
 Anurophorus laricis
 Anurophorus septentrionalis

References

Collembola
Springtail genera